Ana María Eizaguirre Uranga  (born 1 November 1963) is a former Spanish professional basketball player representing Spain. She played in the Spanish League  with Las Banderas, Arjeriz Xuncas from Lugo and Sasarte Oria from San Sebastián. She was runner-up of two consecutive Spanish Cup finals, in 1987 and 1988.

She made her debut with Spain women's national basketball team at the age of 18. She played with the senior team for 6 years, from 1982 to 1988, with a total of  121 caps  and 5.9 PPG.  She participated in three European Championships:
 5th 1981 FIBA Europe Under-18 Championship for Women (youth)
 11th1983 Eurobasket
 10th1985 Eurobasket
 6th1987 Eurobasket

References 

1963 births
Living people
Spanish women's basketball players
Centers (basketball)
People from Azkoitia
Basketball players from the Basque Country (autonomous community)
Sportspeople from Gipuzkoa